The MTA New Zealand Formula Ford Championship has been held annually in New Zealand racing circuits.

History

Formula Ford emerged as a racing class in New Zealand. In 1972, the inaugural New Zealand Formula Ford championship won by David Oxton. The open wheel category rapidly developed into the series for emerging young New Zealand race drivers. Graduates include Brendon Hartley, David Oxton, Dave McMillan, Scott Dixon, Fabian Coulthard and Jonny Reid.

References

External links

Formula Ford series
Formula Ford Championship